Clay County is located in the U.S. state of Missouri and is part of the Kansas City metropolitan area. As of the 2020 census, the county had a population of 253,335, making it the fifth-most populous county in Missouri. Its county seat is Liberty. The county was organized January 2, 1822, and  named in honor of U.S. Representative Henry Clay from Kentucky, later a member of the United States Senate and United States Secretary of State.

Clay County contains many of the area's northern suburbs, along with a substantial portion of the city of Kansas City, Missouri. It also owns and operates the Midwest National Air Center in Excelsior Springs.

History
Clay County was settled primarily from migrants from the Upper Southern states of Kentucky, Tennessee, and Virginia. They brought enslaved persons and slaveholding traditions with them, and quickly started cultivating crops similar to those in Middle Tennessee and Kentucky: hemp and tobacco. Clay was one of several counties settled mostly by Southerners to the north and south of the Missouri River. Given their culture and traditions, this area became known as Little Dixie. In 1860, enslaved persons made up 25% or more of the county's population.

The 1828 execution of Annice, a slave owned by Jeremiah Prior, was the first to occur in Clay County. She was also the first female slave executed in the state of Missouri.

Many members of the Latter Day Saint movement found refuge in Clay County in November 1833. In 1836, mobs and the Missouri State militia viciously drove the members of the church from the county. Leaders of this church, most notably Joseph Smith, were imprisoned for some months in Clay County in the jail at Liberty. In May 2012, the LDS Church opened a Kansas City Missouri Temple six miles southwest of the Liberty Jail site at 7001 Searcy Creek Parkway in Kansas City, Missouri.

Geography
It is the fourth-smallest county in Missouri by area.

Adjacent counties
Clinton County (north)
Ray County (east)
Jackson County (south)
Wyandotte County, Kansas (southwest)
Platte County (west)

Major highways

 Interstate 29
 Interstate 35
 Interstate 435
 U.S. Route 69
 U.S. Route 71
 U.S. Route 169
 Route 1
 Route 9
 Route 10
 Route 33
 Route 92
 Route 152
 Route 210
 Route 291

Demographics

As of the census of 2010,  221,939 people, 72,558 households, and 50,137 families resided in the county. The population density was 558 people per square mile (216/km2).  The 93,918 housing units averaged 236 per square mile (91/km2). The racial makeup of the county was 87.46% White, 5.18% Black or African American, 0.53% Native American, 2.05% Asian, 0.26% Pacific Islander, 1.77% from other races, and 2.75% from two or more races. About 5.90% of the population were Hispanic or Latino of any race. As of the census of 2000, 23.3% were of German, 14.5% American, 11.0% English, 10.8% Irish, and 5.6% Italian ancestry.

Of the 72,558 households, 33.80% had children under the age of 18 living with them, 55.40% were married couples living together, 10.20% had a female householder with no husband present, and 30.90% were not families. About 25.20% of all households were made up of individuals, and 7.40% had someone living alone who was 65 years of age or older. The average household size was 2.50 and the average family size was 3.00.

In the county, the population was distributed as 25.80% under the age of 18, 8.70% from 18 to 24, 32.30% from 25 to 44, 22.30% from 45 to 64, and 10.80% who were 65 years of age or older. The median age was 35 years. For every 100 females, there were 94.60 males. For every 100 females age 18 and over, there were 91.80 males.

In 2015 the median income for a household in Clay County was $62,099. The income per capita in Clay county was $29,793.

In 2010 the median income for a household in the county was $48,347, and for a family was $56,772. Males had a median income of $40,148 versus $27,681 for females. The per capita income for the county was $23,144. About 3.80% of families and 5.50% of the population were below the poverty line, including 6.40% of those under age 18 and 5.50% of those age 65 or over.

Registered voters number 151,042.

2020 Census

Education
School districts include:

K-12:
 Excelsior Springs 40 School District
 Kearney R-I School District
 Lawson R-XIV School District
 Liberty 53 School District
 North Kansas City 74 School District
 Platte County R-III School District
 Clinton County R-III School District
 Smithville R-II School District

Elementary-only district:
 Missouri City 56 School District

Public schools
Excelsior Springs School District No. 40 – Excelsior Springs 
Lewis Elementary School (PK–5) 
Cornerstone Elementary School (K–5) 
Elkhorn Elementary School (K-5)
Excelsior Springs Middle School (6–8) 
Excelsior Springs High School (9–12) 
Excelsior Springs Technical High School (12) – Alternative/Technical School
Kearney R-I School District – Kearney 
Dogwood Elementary School (PreK–5) 
Hawthorne Elementary School (K–5) 
Holt Elementary School (K–5) 
Kearney Elementary School (K–5) 
Southview Elementary School (K–5) 
Kearney Middle School (6–7) 
Kearney Junior High School (8–9) 
Kearney High School (10–12)
Liberty School District No. 53 – Liberty
Liberty Early Childhood Education Center (PreK) 
Alexander Doniphan Elementary School (K–5) 
Franklin Elementary School (K–5) 
Kellybrook Elementary School (K–5) – Kansas City
Lewis & Clark Elementary School (K–5) 
Liberty Oaks Elementary School (K–5) – Kansas City
Lillian Schumacher Elementary School (K–5) 
Manor Hill Elementary School (K–5) 
Ridgeview Elementary School (K–5) 
Shoal Creek Elementary School (K–5) 
Warren Hills Elementary School (K–5) 
Liberty Middle School (6–8) 
South Valley Middle School (6–8) 
Heritage Middle School (6–8) 
Discovery Middle School (6–8) 
Liberty High School (9–12) 
Liberty North High School (9–12)
Missouri City School District No. 56 – Missouri City 
Missouri City Elementary School (K–8)
North Kansas City School District No. 74 – North Kansas City 
Bell Prairie Elementary School (K–5) 
Briarcliff Elementary School (K–5) 
Chapel Hill Elementary School (K–5) 
Chouteu Elementary School (Pre-K–5) 
Clardy Elementary School (2–5) 
Crestview Elementary School (K–5) 
Davidson Elementary School (Pre-K–5) 
Fox Hill Elementary School (K–5) 
Gashland Elementary School (K–1) 
Gracemor Elementary School (Pre-K–5) 
Lakewood Elementary School (Pre-K–5) 
Linden West Elementary School (K–5) – Gladstone 
Maplewood Elementary School (K–5) 
Meadowbrook Elementary School (K–5) 
Nashua Elementary School (K–5) 
Northview Elementary School (K–5) 
Oakwood Manor Elementary School (K–5) 
Ravenwood Elementary School (K–5)
Rising Hill Elementary School (K-5)
Topping Elementary School (K–5) 
West Englewood Elementary School (Pre-K–5) 
Winnwood Elementary School (Pre-K–5) 
Antioch Middle School (6–8) 
Eastgate 6th Grade Center (6)
Gateway 6th Grade Center (6) 
Maple Park Middle School (6–8) 
New Mark Middle School (6–8) 
Northgate Middle School (6–8) 
North Kansas City High School (9–12) 
Oak Park High School (Kansas City) (9–12) 
Staley High School (9–12) 
Winnetonka High School (9–12)
Smithville R-II School District – Smithville 
Smithville Maple Elementary School (Pre-K–6) 
Smithville Horizon Elementary School (Pre-K-6) 
Smithville Eagle Heights Elementary School (Pre-K-6)
Smithville Middle School (7–8) 
Smithville High School (9–12)

Private schools
Northland Christian School - Kansas City (Preschool-12) - Independent Christian
Outreach Christian Early Education Center – Avondale (Pre-K–12) – Nondenominational Christian
Oakhill Day School – Gladstone (Pre-K–7) – Nonsectarian – (Special Programs Emphasis)
St. Andrew the Apostle Parish School – Gladstone (K–9) – Roman Catholic
Northern Hills Christian Academy – Holt (K–9) – Baptist
Prairie Church School – Holt  (K–6)
Covenant Memorial Baptist Day School – Kansas City (K) – Baptist
Eagle Heights Christian School – Kansas City (Pre-K–12) – Baptist
Faith Academy – Kansas City (Pre-K–12) – Nondenominational Christian
St. Charles Borromeo School – Kansas City (K–9) – Roman Catholic
St. Gabriel Catholic School –Kansas City (K–9) – Roman Catholic
St. Patrick School – Kansas City (NS/Pre-K–8) – Roman Catholic
St. Pius X High School – Kansas City (9–12) – Roman Catholic
Liberty Montessori Center – Liberty (K–1) – Montessori
St. James School – Liberty (K–9) – Roman Catholic

Postsecondary
Maple Woods :: Metropolitan Community College—Kansas City—A public, two-year Liberal Arts college
William Jewell College – Liberty – A private, four-year Liberal Arts college.

Libraries, archives, museums

Libraries
Mid-Continent Public Library
North Kansas City Public Library

Archives
Clay County Archives

Museums
Clay County Museum 
Jesse James Bank Museum

Politics

Local
The three-person Clay County Commission oversees the issues of Clay County.  The current makeup of the commissioners is two Republicans and one Democrat.

State

Clay County is divided into eight legislative districts in the Missouri House of Representatives, five of which are held by Republicans and three by Democrats.

District 8 — Randy Railsback (R— Hamilton) — Consists of Holt and Lawson.

District 12 — Josh Hurlbert (R— Smithville) — consists of Smithville, a part of Kansas City, and a part of Kearney.

District 14 — Ashley Aune (D- Kansas City) — consists of a small part of Kansas City.

District 15 — Maggie Nurrenbern (D—Kansas City) — consists of Gladstone, Oaks, Oakview, Oakwood, Oakwood Park, and a part of Kansas City. 

District 16 — Chris Brown (R—Kansas City) — consists of a part of Kansas City. 

District 17 — Mark Ellebracht (D— Liberty) — consists of the communities of Birmingham, Claycomo, Glenaire, a part of Kansas City, and a part of Liberty. 

District 18 — Wes Rogers (D— Kansas City) — consists of the communities of Avondale, part of Kansas City, and North Kansas City. 

 

 

District 38 — Doug Richey (R— Excelsior Springs) — consists of Excelsior Springs, part of Kansas City, part of Kearney, part of Liberty, Missouri City, Mosby, and Prathersville. 

Clay County is divided into two districts in the Missouri Senate, both of which are held by Republicans.

District 12 — Dan Hegeman (R-Cosby) -- consists of the communities of Excelsior Springs, Holt, Kearney, Lawson, Missouri City, Mosby, Prathersville, and Smithville.

District 17 – Lauren Arthur (D-Kansas City) - consists of the communities of Avondale, Birmingham, Claycomo, Gladstone, Glenaire, Liberty, North Kansas City, Oaks, Oakview, Oakwood, Oakwood Park, Pleasant Valley, Randolph, Sugar Creek, and a part of Kansas City.

Federal

Clay County is split between the 5th and 6th congressional districts of Missouri. The southern 30% of the county is represented by Emanuel Cleaver (D-Kansas City).

The northern 70% of the county is represented by Sam Graves (R-Tarkio).

Clay County, like the rest of Missouri, has swung to the Republican Party in the 21st century, though the margins have been very close. In 2000, Al Gore famously won the county by one vote. The margins in favor of Republicans have only deepened as the social liberalism of the Democratic Party has cost them votes in white, rural states such as Missouri—though the county, holding Kansas City, is mainly suburban in culture and remains competitive. In 2016, Donald Trump won the county while Hillary Clinton failed to improve on Barack Obama's percentages with only 41% of the vote. Joe Biden, however, did improve on those margins, winning nearly 47% of the vote in 2020; Trump still carried the county by 4%.

Communities

Cities and towns

Avondale
Birmingham
Claycomo
Excelsior Estates (mostly in Ray County)
Excelsior Springs (small part in Ray County)
Gladstone
Glenaire
Holt (partly in Clinton County)
Kansas City (partly in Jackson and Platte Counties and a small part in Cass County)
Kearney
Lawson (partly in Ray County)
Liberty (county seat)
Missouri City
Mosby
North Kansas City
Oaks
Oakview
Oakwood
Oakwood Park
Pleasant Valley
Prathersville
Randolph
Smithville (small part in Platte County)
Sugar Creek

Unincorporated communities

 Arley
 Chandler
 Claysville
 Clevenger
 Ectonville
 Miltondale
 Roosterville
 Stockdale
 Winner

Notable people
 Frank James, born in Clay County in 1843
 Jesse James, born in Clay County in 1847
 John Ellis Martineau, Governor of Arkansas (1927–1928), born in Clay County in 1873
 Noah Beery, Sr., actor
 Wallace Beery, actor

See also
 List of counties in Missouri
 Mormon War (1838)
National Register of Historic Places listings in Clay County, Missouri

References

Further reading
 Woodson, W.H. History of Clay County, Missouri (1920) online

External links

Clay County government's website 
Clay County Economic Development Council website
 Digitized 1930 Plat Book of Clay County  from University of Missouri Division of Special Collections, Archives, and Rare Books
 Missouri Historical Sites 

 
Little Dixie (Missouri)
Missouri counties
1822 establishments in Missouri
Populated places established in 1822
Missouri counties on the Missouri River